Frances Eileen Edmonds is a British writer. She is known for her books Another Bloody Tour: England in the West Indies (1986) and Cricket XXXX Cricket (1987) about touring with her husband, the former England cricketer Phil Edmonds.

She appeared as a castaway on the BBC Radio programme Desert Island Discs on 9 August 1987, in conversation with Michael Parkinson.

Education 

Edmonds started at New Hall, Cambridge University, in 1970 and graduated with a master's degree in Modern and Medieval Languages.

She is a fellow at the Distinguished Careers Institute, Stanford University.

Personal life 

Edmonds has two younger brothers, both of whom are ophthalmologists. Her older brother is the physician Kieran Moriarty CBE, FRCP, FRCPI.

Edmonds married the former England cricketer Phil Edmonds towards the end of 1976. They have a daughter.

Bibliography 

 (with the English cricket team in the West Indies in 1985–86)

References

External links 

 

Year of birth missing (living people)
Living people
Place of birth missing (living people)
British non-fiction writers
Alumni of New Hall, Cambridge